Kostakis Artymatas (born 15 April 1993) is a Cypriot professional footballer who plays as a defensive midfielder for Cypriot First Division club Anorthosis Famagusta and the Cyprus national team.

Club career

Early career
Artymatas started his playing career when he was eight years old at Enosis Neon Paralimni academies and at age sixteen he moved to Nottingham Forest academies in England where he stayed for three years. He returned to Cyprus in June 2012 and he made his professional debut with Enosis Neon Paralimni on 15 September 2012, in a league match against Anorthosis Famagusta which ended in 1–1 draw.

APOEL
On 14 June 2013, Artymatas moved from Enosis Neon Paralimni to APOEL (for a transfer fee of €120,000) and he signed a four-year contract with his new club. He made his debut on 11 November 2013, in a Cypriot First Division match against Alki Larnaca at GSP Stadium, coming on as an 80th-minute substitute in APOEL's 3–0 victory. A month later, he made his debut in European competitions, playing the full 90 minutes in APOEL's 2–0 defeat at Eintracht Frankfurt for the last matchday of the UEFA Europa League group stage. During his first season at APOEL, he managed to win his first career titles, winning all the Cypriot competitions, the Cypriot League, the Cypriot Cup and the Cypriot Super Cup.

In the 2014–15 season, he added two more trophies to his collection, as APOEL won again both the Cypriot championship and the cup. He scored his first official goal for APOEL on 17 October 2015, netting the fifth goal in APOEL's 6–0 home victory against AEL Limassol for the Cypriot First Division.

On 19 September 2016, Artymatas signed a three-year contract extension with APOEL, running until 31 May 2020.

On 31 August 2017, Artymatas signed a long season contract with Superleague club Kerkyra on loan from APOEL.

Anorthosis
In July 2019 he moved to Anorthosis.

International career
Artymatas made his international debut with Cyprus National Team on 12 October 2012, in a 2014 FIFA World Cup qualification match against Slovenia at Ljudski vrt Stadium, coming on as a 46th-minute substitute in Cyprus' 2–1 defeat.

Career statistics

International

International goals
Scores and results list Cyprus' goal tally first.

References

1993 births
Living people
Cypriot footballers
Cyprus international footballers
Cypriot expatriate footballers
Cypriot expatriate sportspeople in England
Expatriate footballers in England
Enosis Neon Paralimni FC players
PAE Kerkyra players
Nottingham Forest F.C. players
APOEL FC players
Cypriot First Division players
Association football midfielders
Greek Cypriot people
People from Paralimni